The Cap River is a river of New Caledonia. It has a catchment area of 174 square kilometres.

See also
List of rivers of New Caledonia

References

Rivers of New Caledonia